This is a list of American football players who played for the Milwaukee Badgers in the National Football League (NFL).  It includes players that played at least one match in the NFL regular season.  The Milwaukee Badgers franchise was founded in 1922 and lasted until 1926, when the team folded.

A
Fred Abel,
John Alexander, 
Norris Armstrong,
Marion Ashmore

B
Adrian Baril,
Shorty Barr,
Sid Bennett,
Lyle Bigbee,
Russ Blailock,
Roman Brumm,
Johnny Bryan,
Joe Burks

C
Moose Cochran,
Bill Collins,
Jimmy Conzelman, 
Charlie Copley, 
Ron Cullen,
Don Curtin

D
Darroll DeLaPorte,
Lavern Dilweg,
Dinger Doane,
George Douglas,
Jim Dooley,
Jim Dufft,
Red Dunn,
Pat Dunnigan

E
Hal Erickson

F
John Fahay,
Tommy Fallon,
Clarke Fischer,
Bob Foster

G
Budge Garrett,
Chet Gay,
Hank Gillo,
Al Greene

H
Stone Hallquist,
Johnny Heimsch,
Frank Hertz

J
Walt Jean,
Freddie Jordan John Fahay

K
Emmett Keefe, 
Dick King,
Stan Kuick

L
Frank Lane,
Fred Larson

M
Pete Mason,
Marv Mattox,
Larry McGinnis,
Bo McMillin, 
Johnny McNally,
Heinie Miller,
Johnny Milton,
Ward Meese, 
George Mooney,
Frank Morrissey,
Tom Murphy

N
Romanus Nadolney,
Clem Neacy

O
Ossie Orwoll

P
Al Pierotti,
Fritz Pollard,
Earl Potteiger,
Mike Purdy

R
Ed Rate,
Dick Reichle,
Chuck Reichow,
Charlie Richardson,
Paul Robeson,
Fritz Roessler,
Frank Rydzewski

S
Lenny Sachs,
George Seasholtz, 
Duke Slater,
Howie Slater,
Cedric C. Smith,
Russ Smith,
Jim Snyder,
Bill Strickland,
Steve Sullivan,
Evar Swanson

T
Festus Tierney,
Barney Traynor,
Howard Turner,
Tommy Tomlin

U
John Underwood,
Lou Usher

V
Roy Vassau

W
Art Webb,
Bub Weller,
Ad Wenke,
Chet Widerquist,
Ben Winkelman

References

 
Lists of players by National Football League team
Wisconsin sports-related lists